SS Francisco Coronado was a Liberty ship built in the United States during World War II. The ship was named after Francisco Vázquez de Coronado y Luján, a Spanish conquistador who explored the southwestern United States between 1540 and 1542. The ship was built at the Kaiser Shipbuilding Company's shipyard at Vancouver, Washington.

Service history 

SS Francisco Coronado was ordered by the United States Maritime Commission under contract number 394 from Kaiser Shipbuilding's Vancouver Shipyard as Yard number 42. She was operated by Pacific-Atlantic Steamship Company under charter with the Maritime Commission and War Shipping Administration.  The ship was laid down on 18 November 1942. She was launched on 5 January 1943 and was completed on 20 January 1943. 

The ship was sold for demolition to Patapsco Scrap Company on 9 March 1959, and broken up at Baltimore in March 1962.

Notes

References

Citations

Bibliography 

Liberty ships
1943 ships
Ships built in Vancouver, Washington